The Anti-Bolshevik League incident, or AB League Incident (AB tuan shijian, AB 团事件), was a period of political purge in the territory of a Chinese Communist revolutionary base in Jiangxi province. Mao Zedong accused his political rivals of belonging to the Kuomintang intelligence agency "Anti-Bolshevik League". Mao's political purge resulted in killings at Futian and elsewhere, and the trial and execution of Red Army officers and soldiers.

Origins
One account says that in December 1926, the Kuomintang in Jiangxi created a counter-intelligence organization, known as Anti-Bolshevik League, to deal with the Communist Party of China and emergent state of civil war. The league supposedly consisted of handful of people and was dissolved following the April Second Uprising of 1927 in Nanchang. 

A very different account is given in China's Red Army Marches, a strongly pro-Communist account by US author and journalist Agnes Smedley.  The issue remains controversial.

Background
The purge occurred as a result of tensions between Mao's Red Army and other local communist forces. Under the Jiangxi Soviet government (formally established in November 1931), Mao started a political purge against the Jiangxi Action Committee, accusing its members of belonging to the Anti-Bolshevik League and having "liquidationist" tendencies. In response, 120 members of the JAC were arrested, and 17 executed.

In response to the purge, a local Red Army faction in Futian rebelled against Mao, claiming that Mao was attempting to arrest Zhu De and Peng Dehuai, and surrender to the  KMT army. Mao's forces destroyed the rebel communists in response (early December 1930).
The rebellion, known as the Futian incident, highlighted the friction that existed between factions of the Red Army during the early days of the Communist revolution. The incident also vindicated Mao's position as leader of the Red Army, with Generals Zhu De and Peng Dehuai giving their unequivocal support, despite their political differences.

According to Agnes Smedley's 1934 account in China's Red Army Marches, another body called the "Social Democrats" was also involved - allied to but separate from the alleged Anti-Bolshevik League.  It was in favor of moderate land reform and of reducing rents but not of abolishing landlords.

Further developments
In September 1956, Mao admitted that the purges, in particular the Futian incident, were a mistake, in which the wrong people were killed. In 1988, President Yang Shangkun commissioned an investigation into the Futian incident, which recommended the rehabilitation of the victims, but it was never followed up due to the Tiananmen Square protests.

References

1930 in China
Political and cultural purges
Persecution of Christians
Human rights abuses in China
Massacres in China